Lipparini is an Italian surname. Notable people with the surname include:

Giovanni Lipparini (died 1788), Italian sculptor
Ludovico Lipparini (1800–1856), Italian painter

Italian-language surnames